"Friend de Semana" is a song recorded by Mexican singer and actress Danna Paola in collaboration with Brazilian singer Luísa Sonza and Spanish singer Aitana. Written by both performers alongside Arthur Marqués, Pedro Malaver, Mango and Nabález and produced by the latter two, the song was released on October 30, 2020 through Universal Music as a single off Paola's compilation extended play Friend de Semana, released on that same day. It was also featured in Paola's sixth studio album K.O. (2021)

Background 
On October 24, all three performers began teasing the collaboration on Twitter. The track was officially confirmed two days later.

Music video 
Due to international travel restrictions to prevent the spread of COVID-19, the music video had to be filmed remotedly, with all performers being at their home country. The music video revolves around a high school in which Paola is the principal, Sonza the physical education teacher and Aitana a physics professor.

Charts

Release history

References 

2020 songs
2020 singles
Aitana (singer) songs
Spanish songs
Songs written by Aitana (singer)